The Caloosahatchee River is a river on the southwest Gulf Coast of Florida in the United States, approximately  long. It drains rural areas on the northern edge of the Everglades, east of Fort Myers.  An important link in the Okeechobee Waterway, a manmade inland waterway system of southern Florida, the river forms a tidal estuary along most of its course and has become the subject of efforts to restore and preserve the Everglades.

Description 

It flows west-southwest past LaBelle, where it becomes tidal, forming an estuary along its lower . It broadens as it nears the gulf, passing Fort Myers and Cape Coral.

The  C-43 Caloosahatchee Canal connecting Lake Hicpochee to Lake Okeechobee allows continuous navigation from the Caloosahatchee to the Okeechobee Waterway system; oxbow lakes mark isolated stretches of the original waterway. In 2013 heavy rains in southern Florida resulted in high runoff into Lake Okeechobee; rising lake levels forced the United States Army Corps of Engineers to release large volumes of polluted water from the lake through the St. Lucie River estuary to the east and the Caloosahatchee River estuary to the west. Thus the normal mix of fresh and salt water in those estuaries was replaced by a flood of polluted fresh water resulting in ecological damage.

Until late in the 19th century the Caloosahatchee River was fed by a series of lakes starting from Lake Hicpochee, and including Lettuce Lake, Bonnet Lake and Flirt Lake. A waterfall and set of rapids at the lower end of Flirt Lake marked the beginning of the river. Water flowed from Lake Hicpochee westward into Lettuce Lake and then Bonnet Lake. When the water was high the two lakes merged. All of the lakes were surrounded by extensive wetlands.

In 1881 Hamilton Disston, as part of a scheme to drain large areas of wetlands in the interior of Florida, had a canal dredged from Lake Okeechobee to Lake Hicpochee and through the lakes and wetlands to the west. His company removed the rock ledge that formed the falls and rapids below Lake Flirt, and straightened the upper reaches of the Caloosahatchee River. Various state and federal projects have widened and deepened the river since then. The conversion of the Caloosahatchee River into a canal drained Lake Flirt and the wetlands descending from Lake Hicpochee.

Since the late 19th century, dredging and channelization of the river, as well as the artificial connection to Lake Okeechobee and its use as a water supply for urban and agricultural uses, have substantially altered the hydrology of the river. As a result, both the magnitude and timing of water delivery to the estuary have been substantially altered. Recent programs by the state government have attempted to establish minimum flow levels in the river, in part to help restore the water supply to the Everglades. A federal wildlife refuge for manatees has been established at the mouth of the river on San Carlos Bay near Fort Myers.

Crossings
The following is a list of bridge crossings of the Caloosahatchee River and Canal

Gallery

See also
 South Atlantic-Gulf Water Resource Region

References

External links 
 South Florida Water Management District: Caloosahatchee River and Estuary
 GulfBase.org: Caloosahatchee River
 USFWS: Caloosahatchee River-San Carlos Bay Federal Manatee Refuge
 Caloosahatchee River Citizens Association (Riverwatch)
 Caloosahatchee River Watershed - Florida DEP

 
Rivers of Florida
Intracoastal Waterway
Drainage basins of the Gulf of Mexico
Bodies of water of Hendry County, Florida
Bodies of water of Glades County, Florida
Rivers of Lee County, Florida
Canals in Florida
Lake Okeechobee
Fort Myers, Florida
List of place names of Choctaw origin in the United States